Phillip Jack Brooks (born October 26, 1978), better known by the ring name CM Punk, is an American professional wrestler, sports commentator, actor, and retired mixed martial artist currently signed to All Elite Wrestling (AEW). Best known for his time in WWE, Brooks' 434-day reign as WWE Champion stands as the sixth longest in the championship's history.

Brooks began his professional wrestling career in 1999 on the independent circuit, mainly with Ring of Honor (ROH), winning the ROH World Championship once. He signed with World Wrestling Entertainment (WWE) in 2005 and won the WWE Championship twice, the World Heavyweight Championship three times, and the Intercontinental Championship and the ECW World Heavyweight Championship once each. Brooks also won the World Tag Team Championship, becoming WWE's 19th Triple Crown Champion; the fastest wrestler to do so, in 203 days. He is also the only back-to-back Money in the Bank winner, has headlined several WWE pay-per-view events, won Superstar of the Year at the 2011 Slammy Awards, and was voted Wrestler of the Year in 2011 and 2012 by readers of Pro Wrestling Illustrated. After becoming disillusioned with WWE, Brooks acrimoniously departed the company and retired from professional wrestling in 2014. After much speculation, he joined AEW in 2021 and has since become a two-time AEW World Champion.

Brooks has used the CM Punk moniker for his entire professional wrestling career, and his character has been consistently portrayed as outspoken, confrontational, sharp-tongued, anti-establishment, straight edge, and iconoclastic, most of which are inspired by his real-life views and personality. Depending on his alignment as a hero or villain, Brooks has emphasized different aspects of the straight edge lifestyle to garner the desired audience reaction.

After his initial retirement from professional wrestling, Brooks pursued a career as a mixed martial artist and signed with the Ultimate Fighting Championship (UFC) in 2014. A welterweight, he had his first professional fight at UFC 203 in 2016, losing via submission to Mickey Gall. He then lost his second fight to Mike Jackson via unanimous decision at UFC 225 in 2018 (later overturned to a no-contest) and was subsequently released. Brooks has also appeared as a color commentator for Cage Fury Fighting Championships (CFFC) and was an analyst on WWE Backstage. 

Brooks had his first lead acting role in the animated film The Flintstones & WWE: Stone Age SmackDown! (2015) and has since starred in the horror films Girl on the Third Floor (2019) and Rabid (2019).

Early life
Phillip Jack Brooks was born in Chicago on October 26, 1978, the son of a housewife and an engineer. He grew up in nearby Lockport, where he attended Lockport Township High School. He has five siblings. His father struggled with alcoholism, which inspired Brooks to follow a straight edge lifestyle from an early age; his mother had bipolar disorder, causing him to become estranged from her.

Professional wrestling career

Early career and IWA Mid-South (1999–2005)

Brooks' first venture into wrestling was a stint in a backyard wrestling federation called the Lunatic Wrestling Federation with his brother Mike and their friends in the mid-late 1990s. He had his debut match on March 13, 1999. He first started using the ring name CM Punk when he was put into a tag team named The Chick Magnets with CM Venom after another performer skipped out on the card; the CM stood for "Chick Magnet". Unlike his friends, Punk genuinely wanted to be a wrestler and saw it as more than simple fun. When the promotion started taking off while doing shows out of a warehouse in Mokena, Illinois, Punk found out that his brother had embezzled thousands of dollars from the small company, causing them to become estranged. They have not spoken since.

Punk soon left the federation and enrolled as a student at the Steel Dominion wrestling school in Chicago, where he was trained by Ace Steel, Danny Dominion and Kevin Quinn to become a professional wrestler. As part of the training, he began wrestling at Steel Domain Wrestling in St. Paul, Minnesota, in 1999. It was in the Steel Domain that he met Scott Colton, who soon adopted the ring name Colt Cabana. Punk and Cabana became best friends and spent most of their early career together working in the same independent promotions, as both opponents and tag team partners. In the independents, along with fellow Steel Domain graduates Colt Cabana, Chucke E. Smooth, Adam Pearce, and manager Dave Prazak, Punk formed an alliance named the Gold Bond Mafia.

In 2002, Punk became the International Wrestling Cartel (IWC) Heavyweight Champion, in Monroeville, PA.  Punk would compete in the company's Super Indy tournament, but never won the championship.  Punk's home promotion for his early career was considered to be the Independent Wrestling Association Mid-South (IWA Mid-South). During Punk's time in IWA Mid-South, he had high-profile feuds with Colt Cabana and Chris Hero while also rising to the top of the roster winning the IWA Mid-South Light Heavyweight Championship twice and the IWA Mid-South Heavyweight Championship on five separate occasions, beating wrestlers like A.J. Styles, Cabana, and Eddie Guerrero in matches for the heavyweight championship. Punk's feud with Hero included a 55-minute Tables, Ladders, and Chairs (TLC) match, a 93-minute two out of three falls match and several 60-minute time limit draws. From July 2003 until May 2004, Punk refused to wrestle for IWA Mid-South, explaining this as a protest to Ian Rotten's mistreatment of Chris Hero in the company. However, Hero has stated he believes there were other reasons and Rotten's treatment of him was just an excuse by Punk to stop working for the company. Punk eventually returned to IWA Mid-South and continued to perform as a wrestler and commentator for them until July 2005.

Ring of Honor

Feud with Raven and rise to prominence (2002–2004)

Punk's matches with Colt Cabana led him to being hired by the Ring of Honor (ROH) promotion. CM Punk made his in ring debut on ROH at ROH All Star Extravaganza on November 9, 2002, in a gauntlet match involving five participants, that was won by Bryan Danielson. Initially, Punk joined ROH as a face, but quickly turned heel in a feud with Raven that featured numerous variants of no disqualification matches. Their rivalry was rooted in Punk's straight-edge lifestyle, with him likening Raven to his alcoholic father; it lasted most of 2003 and was considered one of ROH's top feuds of the year. Their rivalry was settled at The Conclusion in November 2003, where Punk defeated Raven in a steel cage match.

Punk started climbing the ranks of ROH, including coming in second at the Second Anniversary Show during the tournament to crown the first ROH Pure Champion, losing to A.J. Styles in the finals and winning the ROH Tag Team Championship twice with Colt Cabana as The Second City Saints (Punk and Cabana defeated the Briscoe Brothers to win the championship both times). Circa October 2003, Punk was hired as the first head trainer of the Ring of Honor wrestling school, having previously been a trainer for the Steel Domain and Primetime Wrestling.

ROH World Champion (2004–2006)
In 2004, Punk faced off against ROH World Champion Samoa Joe for the championship in a three-match series. On June 12 at World Title Classic, the first match resulted in a 60-minute time limit draw when neither Punk nor Joe could pin or cause the other to submit in the 60 minutes. On October 16 at Joe vs. Punk II, they wrestled to a second 60-minute draw. In addition to Joe vs. Punk II becoming Ring of Honor's bestselling DVD at the time, the match received a five-star rating by famed wrestling journalist Dave Meltzer of the Wrestling Observer Newsletter. It was the first match in North America to receive a five-star rating in seven years, the last one being the Hell in a Cell match between Shawn Michaels and The Undertaker at Badd Blood: In Your House in 1997. Joe ended the series by defeating Punk in the third and final match on December 4 at All-Star Extravaganza 2 in which there was a no-time-limit stipulation.

After a try-out match on May 9, 2005, which aired May 15, where he lost to Val Venis on the Sunday Night Heat show, Punk accepted a deal offered by World Wrestling Entertainment (WWE) in June. Though he had accepted the deal, Punk defeated Austin Aries to win the ROH World Championship on June 18 at Death Before Dishonor III. Immediately after the match, Punk proceeded to become a villain and started a storyline where he threatened to bring the ROH World Championship to WWE with him. For weeks, Punk teased the ROH locker room and the ROH fans and mocked the championship he possessed, going so far as to sign his WWE contract on it. During the storyline, referred to by ROH as the "Summer of Punk", Mick Foley made several ROH appearances, attempting to convince Punk to do the right thing and defend the title on his way out. On August 12, Punk lost the ROH World Championship to James Gibson in a four corner elimination match which also involved Samoa Joe and Christopher Daniels. Punk's final scheduled match in ROH took place at Punk: The Final Chapter on August 13, against long-time friend Colt Cabana in a two out of three falls match, which he lost.

Punk made a special appearance at the ROH show Unscripted II on February 11, 2006, when the original card had to be scrapped due to Low Ki leaving ROH the week prior. In addition, most of the ROH roster contracted to TNA were pulled from the show because of a snowstorm that TNA officials thought might prevent performers from reaching the TNA's Against All Odds event scheduled the next day. In the main event, Punk teamed with Bryan Danielson to defeat Adam Pearce and Jimmy Rave in a tag team match.

Due to his work with the promotion, Punk was inducted into the ROH Hall of Fame as part of the 2022 inaugural class.

Total Nonstop Action Wrestling (2003–2004)
While wrestling for Ring of Honor, Punk joined the wrestling promotion NWA: Total Nonstop Action, now known as Impact Wrestling, in which he was paired with Julio Dinero as members of Raven's TNA alliance The Gathering.

Shortly before a TNA show on February 25, 2004, Punk had a physical scuffle with Teddy Hart outside of a restaurant that was broken up by Sabu. The scuffle reportedly stemmed from an ROH show in which Hart performed three unplanned spots putting several other wrestlers in danger of injury. Around the time of the scuffle, Punk and Dinero stopped appearing on TNA shows, leading to speculation he was fired for the incident. However, Punk said the scuffle had no bearing on his TNA career. Brooks said the reason he and Dinero stopped appearing on TNA's pay-per-view events was that TNA officials believed that he and Dinero had not connected with the fans as villains, having turned against the popular Raven and instead formed a villainous tag team managed by James Mitchell. The officials decided that since the team was not working as villains, the storyline would be put on hold indefinitely, and thus had no work for Punk or Dinero. Punk officially quit TNA in March 2004 during the Rob Feinstein controversy after having a dispute with the TNA offices over his ability to compete in ROH following a TNA order that their contracted wrestlers were to no longer wrestle in ROH.

World Wrestling Entertainment/WWE

Ohio Valley Wrestling (2005–2006)
In September 2005, Punk was assigned to Ohio Valley Wrestling (OVW), a WWE developmental territory. He made his debut as a heel on September 8 in a dark match, where he, Nigel McGuinness and Paul Burchill were defeated by Deuce Shade, Elijah Burke and Seth Skyfire. On September 26 in his OVW television debut, Punk sustained a ruptured eardrum and broken nose after Danny Inferno hit him with an overly stiff right hand. Despite the injury, Punk finished the match and quickly recovered.

On November 9, Punk became the OVW Television Champion after defeating Ken Doane, Immediately after, Punk began to feud with Brent Albright, who had previously been feuding with Doane for the Television Championship and had lost his chance to wrestle Doane after Punk hit him with a chair so he could wrestle Doane. They wrestled in a series of matches, including one that ended in overtime with Albright having Punk submit to Albright's finisher, the Crowbar, but Punk was able to keep the championship as he had not agreed to the extra time. On January 4, 2006, Punk lost the OVW Television Championship during a Three Way Dance among himself, Albright and Doane. Doane was injured during the match and was replaced by Aaron "The Idol" Stevens, who won the match and became the new OVW Television Champion. After Matt Cappotelli vacated the OVW Heavyweight Championship because of a brain tumor in February, a tournament was held to crown a new champion. Punk lost to Albright in the finals. Punk and Albright continued their feud, with Albright becoming more unstable and paranoid about maintaining his championship after several close-call matches against Punk, resulting in acts such as threatening Maria. On May 3, Punk defeated Albright in a strap match to win the OVW Heavyweight Championship. As champion, Punk retained the title in matches against opponents such as Ken Kennedy, Johnny Jeter, and Mike "The Miz" Mizanin.

On July 28, Punk and Seth Skyfire defeated Shad Gaspard and the Neighborhoodie to win the OVW Southern Tag Team Championship at a house show. They lost the tag team championship on August 2 to Deuce Shade and "Domino" Cliff Compton. Later that month, Punk also lost the OVW Heavyweight Championship when he was defeated by Chet Jablonski. Punk continued to make sporadic appearances for OVW until WWE and OVW ended their developmental partnership on February 7, 2008.

ECW Champion (2006–2008)

On June 24, 2006, Punk made his ECW debut during a house show at the former ECW Arena, defeating Stevie Richards. He made his television debut on the July 4 episode of ECW, cutting a brief pre-taped promo about his straight edge lifestyle emphasizing the disciplinary aspects of being drug and alcohol free. Although he had retained the straight edge gimmick, he now had a Muay Thai training background. Punk made his television wrestling debut on August 1 at the Hammerstein Ballroom, defeating Justin Credible. Punk established himself in ECW by going undefeated, defeating opponents such as C. W. Anderson, Stevie Richards and Shannon Moore.

Soon after, Punk began feuding with Mike Knox after Knox's on-screen girlfriend Kelly Kelly was seen to have romantic feelings for Punk. Punk defeated Knox in their first singles match on the November 7 episode of ECW as well as a rematch the following week, after which Kelly Kelly celebrated Punk's victory over Knox. At Survivor Series, Punk had his first pay-per-view match when he teamed with D-Generation X (Shawn Michaels and Triple H) (DX) and the Hardy Boyz (Jeff and Matt) in their Survivor Series match against Rated-RKO (Edge and Randy Orton), Knox, Johnny Nitro and Gregory Helms, a match in which all the participants on DX's side survived elimination. On December 3 at December to Dismember, Punk participated in the Extreme Elimination Chamber match for the ECW World Championship, but he was the first person eliminated by Rob Van Dam.

On the January 9, 2007, episode of ECW, Punk had his first loss in ECW against Hardcore Holly, ending his six-month unbeaten streak in singles competition. He also participated on the Money in the Bank ladder match at WrestleMania 23, WWE's biggest PPV, but lost the match. On the April 10 episode of ECW, Punk was involved in the feud between the New Breed, a group of young wrestlers and ECW Originals, the group of veteran wrestlers from the original ECW. Punk joined the New Breed after several weeks in which both the New Breed and the ECW Originals had attempted to recruit him. However, two weeks later he betrayed the New Breed during a four-on-four tag team match between the New Breed and ECW Originals by kicking New Breed leader Elijah Burke in the back of the head and costing them the match, after which Punk proceeded to deliver his finisher, the "Go to Sleep". On May 20 at Judgment Day, Punk defeated Burke in his first singles match on a WWE pay-per-view event. Punk then went on to One Night Stand on June 3 and teamed up with Tommy Dreamer and The Sandman in a tables match to defeat the New Breed and end the storyline.

When ECW World Champion Bobby Lashley was drafted to Raw and stripped of the championship, a tournament to declare a new champion was held. On June 24, Punk was scheduled to face Chris Benoit in the finals at Vengeance: Night of Champions, but Benoit was replaced by Johnny Nitro due to Benoit no showing because of the double murder and suicide he committed that same weekend. Nitro subsequently defeated Punk for the vacant ECW World Championship. During the following months, Punk faced Nitro (who later changed his ringname to John Morrison) for the title at The Great American Bash, and SummerSlam, where he lost to Morrison both times.

On the September 4 episode of ECW, Punk defeated Morrison in a last chance title match to win the ECW Championship. In the following months, Punk went on to have successful title defenses against the likes of Elijah Burke at Unforgiven, Big Daddy V via disqualification at No Mercy, and The Miz at Cyber Sunday. On the November 6 episode of ECW, Punk retained the ECW Championship in a match against Morrison following Miz's interference. On November 18 at Survivor Series, Punk retained the title in a triple threat match against Miz and Morrison. On the January 22, 2008, episode of ECW, Punk lost the ECW Championship to Chavo Guerrero Jr. in a no disqualification match after Edge performed a spear on him, ending his reign at 143 days.

World Heavyweight Champion (2008–2009)
On March 30 at WrestleMania XXIV, Punk won the Money in the Bank ladder match after defeating Carlito, Chris Jericho, John Morrison, Montel Vontavious Porter, Mr. Kennedy and Shelton Benjamin. At Judgment Day on May 18, Punk teamed with Kane to unsuccessfully challenge John Morrison and The Miz for the WWE Tag Team Championship.

On June 23, Punk was drafted to the Raw brand during the 2008 WWE draft. In his first night on Raw the following week, Punk cashed in his Money in the Bank contract after Batista beat down World Heavyweight Champion Edge and won the title, making his first defense later that same night against John "Bradshaw" Layfield (JBL), who had challenged him shortly after his win. Punk continued to hold and defend the title (against the likes of Batista at The Great American Bash and the July 21 episode of Raw, and JBL at SummerSlam) until Unforgiven, when he was attacked by The Legacy and Randy Orton finished the assault by punting Punk in the head before the Championship scramble match on September 7, ending his reign at 69 days. Punk could not participate in the match due to the attack and so forfeited the title, being replaced by Chris Jericho, who won the match and the title. On the September 15 episode of Raw, Punk received his title rematch, but he failed to regain the title in a steel cage match against Jericho.

On the October 27 episode of Raw, Punk and Kofi Kingston defeated Cody Rhodes and Ted DiBiase to win the World Tag Team Championship. The duo were members of Team Batista at Survivor Series, where their team lost to Team Orton on November 23 as Punk was eliminated by Rhodes. Punk then entered in a number one contender Intercontinental Championship tournament, defeating Snitsky and John Morrison in the first two rounds. Punk and Kingston lost the World Tag Team Championship to John Morrison and The Miz on December 13 at a live event. The next day at Armageddon, Punk defeated Rey Mysterio in the tournament finals. On the January 5, 2009, episode of Raw, Punk received his title match against William Regal, which ended in a disqualification when Regal grabbed the referee's jersey. Due to this, Stephanie McMahon awarded Punk a rematch the following week on Raw, but this time Punk got disqualified. McMahon awarded him another rematch, a no disqualification match on the January 19 episode of Raw, where Punk defeated Regal to win the Intercontinental Championship. With this win, Punk became the 19th WWE Triple Crown Champion and the fastest to accomplish the feat, shattering Kevin Nash's old record at 203 days. Punk lost the Intercontinental Championship on the March 9 Raw to John "Bradshaw" Layfield (JBL). On April 5 at WrestleMania 25, Punk won the Money in the Bank ladder match and became the first person to win the match twice. On April 13 during the 2009 WWE draft, Punk was drafted to the SmackDown brand. In the period after the draft, Punk feuded with Umaga over Umaga's repeated surprise attacks while Punk was attempting to cash in his Money in the Bank contract, ultimately resulting in a Samoan strap match at Extreme Rules, which was won by Punk.

Later that night, Punk cashed in his Money in the Bank contract to defeat Jeff Hardy for the World Heavyweight Championship right after Hardy won the title from Edge in a ladder match. Punk made his first successful title defense in a triple threat match against both Edge and Hardy on the June 15 episode of Raw. On June 28 at The Bash, Punk retained the title even though he lost to Hardy by disqualification (because titles do not change hands on a disqualification) after kicking the referee. As part of the storyline, Punk injured his eye and said that he could not see the referee, but Hardy called his eye injury into question, believing it to be feigned, with Punk turning heel and claiming to be the moral superior of those who support Hardy due to his drug-free lifestyle. On July 26 at Night of Champions, Punk lost the World Heavyweight Championship to Hardy. Their feud continued through SummerSlam on August 23, when Punk regained the title in a TLC match only to be attacked by The Undertaker.

On the August 28 episode of SmackDown, Punk concluded his feud with Hardy and achieved his booked goal of excising him from WWE, defeating Hardy in a steel cage match to retain the World Heavyweight Championship wherein the loser agreed to leave the company. On September 13 at Breaking Point, Punk defeated The Undertaker in a submission match to retain the World Heavyweight Championship. Undertaker originally won the match with his "Hell's Gate" submission hold, but SmackDown general manager Theodore Long restarted the match after stating that the ban that former SmackDown general manager Vickie Guerrero had placed on the move was still in effect and Punk won the match with his "Anaconda Vise" when referee Scott Armstrong called for the bell despite Undertaker never submitting (reminiscent to the Montreal Screwjob, which took place in the same venue in 1997). The feud between the two continued and on October 4 at Hell in a Cell he lost the World Heavyweight Championship to The Undertaker in a Hell in a Cell match. Punk lost two subsequent rematches for the World Heavyweight Championship against The Undertaker on the October 23 SmackDown and on October 25 at Bragging Rights in a fatal four-way match also involving Batista and Rey Mysterio.

Straight Edge Society (2009–2010)

His character took on a more sinister direction on the November 27 episode of SmackDown when Punk revealed that he had converted Luke Gallows, who had previously been portrayed as the mentally incompetent wrestler Festus, to the straight-edge lifestyle which had rid him of his mental troubles. Through January 2010, Punk began to convert planted members of the audience to a straight-edge lifestyle, making them take a pledge of allegiance to him and shaving their head as a sign of renewal and devotion. After converting many people who were not seen again, convert Serena began accompanying Punk and Gallows to form The Straight Edge Society. As well as leading this alliance, Punk was also the mentor of NXT rookie Darren Young who flirted with the idea of becoming straight edge before refusing just before his head was to be shaved. Punk also gave sermons including during the annual Royal Rumble match in January 2010 as well as during an Elimination Chamber match in February 2010 at both of the eponymous pay-per-view events.

During the first months of 2010, Punk feuded with Rey Mysterio, being eliminated by him during the Elimination Chamber match. After Mysterio prevented him from winning a Money in the Bank qualifying match, Punk interrupted Mysterio's celebration of his daughter's ninth birthday. Mysterio and Punk faced each other in a match at WrestleMania XXVI, where if Mysterio lost, he would join the Straight Edge Society, but Punk lost to Mysterio at WrestleMania. They had a rematch at Extreme Rules where Punk would have to shave his head like his disciples if he lost, but he won this match after interference from Joey Mercury, a fourth member of the Straight Edge Society. On May 23 at Over The Limit, a third and final match between Punk and Mysterio was booked with both stipulations reactivated, but Punk lost and was subsequently shaved bald.

After the match, Punk began wearing a black mask, since he considered himself always pure unlike his followers and was embarrassed by his baldness. On June 20 at Fatal 4-Way, Punk challenged for the World Heavyweight Championship against Mysterio, Big Show and the champion Jack Swagger, but he was unsuccessful when he was attacked by Kane, who was accusing various people of attacking The Undertaker. Punk and his stable started a feud with Big Show when on the July 16 episode of SmackDown, Big Show unmasked Punk. Big Show faced the Straight Edge Society in a three-on-one handicap match on August 15 at SummerSlam, winning the match after Punk abandoned his teammates. The next month, at Night of Champions, Punk lost to Big Show in a singles match. The Straight Edge Society angle ended after Serena was released from WWE and Mercury became injured, and Punk defeated Gallows in a singles match on the September 24 SmackDown.

The New Nexus (2010–2011)

On October 11, Punk was traded back to the Raw brand after being swapped with Edge and took part in the interbrand tag team match on October 24 at Bragging Rights after defeating Evan Bourne to win a place, but Team Raw lost as Punk was eliminated by Rey Mysterio. It was reported later that Punk was suffering with a hip injury that would stop him from competing. To keep a presence on television, he began commentating on Raw from November 22.

At the end of December, Punk left the commentary team after assaulting John Cena on Raw and SmackDown with a chair. Punk later revealed that his motives for the attacks were that he had joined and assumed control of The Nexus. Punk then made each member of the group prove themselves worthy of a spot, with some instead choosing to join The Corre, which had been started by former Nexus leader Wade Barrett on SmackDown.

In January 2011, Punk and The Nexus cost Orton his match with The Miz for the WWE Championship at the Royal Rumble as a revenge for Orton prematurely ending Punk's first World Heavyweight Championship reign in 2008. In turn, Orton responded by taking out all of the New Nexus members by punting them in the head, leaving Punk alone as the sole surviving member of the group. This led to a match at WrestleMania XXVII on April 3 and a Last Man Standing match on May 1 at Extreme Rules, both of which Punk lost.

WWE Champion (2011–2013)
In June 2011, after pinning WWE Champion John Cena on the June 13 episode of Raw, Rey Mysterio at Capitol Punishment, and finally Alberto Del Rio in a number one contender's triple threat match (which also included Mysterio) all within one week, Punk revealed that his contract was to expire on July 17 at Money in the Bank and vowed to leave the company with the WWE Championship. After making a scathing yet highly acclaimed on-air speech, often referred to as the Pipe Bomb, concerning the way in which WWE is run and its owner Vince McMahon, Punk was given a storyline suspension from televised WWE events. Punk would be reinstated on Cena's insistence. Upon his return, Punk ceased to appear with the remaining members of The Nexus and the group quietly dissolved that month, turning Punk face. At Money in the Bank, Punk defeated Cena to become the WWE Champion on his final night under contract with WWE. The match received a five-star rating from Dave Meltzer, marking Punk's second performance to attain a five-star rating. The match is also considered one of the greatest professional wrestling matches of all times.

On July 21, Punk made a surprise appearance at a joint WWE–Mattel panel at San Diego Comic-Con, where he mocked new chief operating officer Triple H and offered WWE Championship tournament finalist Rey Mysterio a match for the WWE Championship as long as it was in Punk's hometown of Chicago. Punk appeared at July 23's All American Wrestling show, showing respect to Gregory Iron, a wrestler with cerebral palsy. Mysterio won the WWE Championship tournament on the July 25 episode of Raw only to lose it to Cena later that night. After Cena's victory Punk returned and upstaged the new WWE Champion's celebration while also entering into a title dispute. Triple H later upheld both Punk and Cena's claims to the WWE Championship as legitimate and scheduled the two to a match at SummerSlam to decide the undisputed WWE Champion. At SummerSlam on August 14, Punk won, but he lost the title minutes later to Alberto Del Rio, who had cashed in his Money in the Bank contract after Kevin Nash attacked Punk.

The night after SummerSlam, Punk accused Nash of conspiring with Triple H to keep Punk away from the WWE Championship. After repeated confrontations, Nash and Punk demanded to face each other at Night of Champions, to which Triple H acquiesced, but after Punk's repeated verbal attacks towards him and his wife Stephanie McMahon, Triple H booked himself to replace Nash. At Night of Champions, Punk lost a no disqualification match to Triple H after Nash, The Miz and R-Truth attacked both men. Miz and Truth also attacked Punk on October 2 at Hell in a Cell after he lost a WWE Championship triple threat Hell in a Cell match to Del Rio. Punk attempted to avenge this by teaming with Triple H against Miz and Truth on October 23 at Vengeance, but they lost due to Nash attacking Triple H. This helped transition Punk's anti-establishment voice from Triple H to John Laurinaitis, who became the interim Raw general manager. Punk balked at Laurinaitis' promotion and verbally attacked him as a dull yes man.

On the October 31 episode of Raw, Punk strong-armed his way into a match with Del Rio at Survivor Series, regaining the WWE Championship at the event on November 20. Punk went on to defend the title through the end of the year, retaining in a rematch with Del Rio on the November 28 episode of Raw and against both Del Rio and The Miz in a triple threat TLC match on December 18 at TLC: Tables, Ladders & Chairs. On the December 26 episode of Raw, Punk was defeated by Dolph Ziggler in a gauntlet match and as a result Ziggler became the number one contender to the WWE Championship (had he been successful, Punk would have earned the right to face Laurinaitis in a match). The following week on Raw, Punk was defeated by Ziggler by countout after Laurinaitis interfered, retaining the championship as a result. Intermeddling from Laurinaitis caused Punk to lose to Ziggler throughout January, which ultimately led to Punk attacking Laurinaitis in retaliation. At the Royal Rumble on January 29, 2012, Punk successfully defended his title against Ziggler despite Laurinaitis acting as the outside enforcer.

On the January 30 episode of Raw, the returning Chris Jericho attacked Punk and Daniel Bryan during their Champion vs. Champion match, giving Bryan the win. The following week on Raw, Jericho explained his actions by dismissing the WWE roster as imitations of himself and singling out Punk for calling himself "the best in the world", a moniker Jericho used the last time he was in WWE. Their rivalry continued through Elimination Chamber on February 19, when Punk retained the WWE Championship in the namesake structure, but while four competitors were eliminated Jericho was unable to continue the match after being kicked out of the chamber by Punk, causing temporary injury. The next night on Raw, Jericho earned a match against Punk on April 1 at WrestleMania XXVIII and in a bid to psychologically unsettle him revealed Punk's father was an alcoholic and alleged that his sister was a drug addict, asserting that Punk's straight edge philosophy was paranoia to avoid the same vices and vowing to make Punk turn to alcohol by winning the title from him. John Laurinaitis added the stipulation that the WWE Championship could change hands via disqualification, which led to Jericho inciting Punk into using a weapon, but Punk resisted and retained the title. On the April 2 and 9 episodes of Raw, Punk retained the WWE Championship against Mark Henry after losing to him via countout and disqualification, being attacked by Jericho following both matches and doused with alcohol. On the April 16 episode of Raw, Punk pinned Henry in a no disqualification, no countout match to retain the title. After repeated altercations, the feud between Jericho and Punk culminated in a Chicago street fight on April 29 at Extreme Rules, where Punk defeated Jericho to retain the WWE Championship.

On May 20 at Over the Limit, Punk retained the title against Daniel Bryan after reversing Bryan's submission hold the ""Yes!" Lock" into a pinning combination as the pinfall saved Punk from his own submission only moments later. Shortly before Over the Limit, Bryan interfered in a non-title match between Punk and Kane to frame Punk for attacking Kane with a steel chair, starting a three-way rivalry. On the June 1 episode of SmackDown, a WWE Championship match between Punk and Kane ended in a double disqualification after Bryan attacked both men. Meanwhile, Bryan's jilted ex-girlfriend AJ Lee turned her affections to both Punk and Kane. This feud culminated in a triple threat match on June 17 at No Way Out, where Punk managed to retain the title after AJ distracted Kane. On July 15 at Money in the Bank, Punk defeated Bryan in a no disqualification match with AJ as special guest referee to retain the title and end the feud.

On July 23 at Raw 1000, Punk defended the title against Money in the Bank winner John Cena and lost by disqualification after interference from Big Show. When the night's special guest The Rock – who had interrupted Punk earlier to announce he would wrestle for the WWE Championship at the Royal Rumble in January 2013 – intervened to save Cena from Big Show's assault, Punk attacked Rock, turning heel in the process. Punk justified his actions the following week on Raw, explaining he was tired of people like Cena and Rock overshadowing him when the WWE Champion should be the focus of the company, asserting himself further soon after by disrupting a number one contender's match between Cena and Big Show. As a result, both men were entered into the title match against Punk on August 19 at SummerSlam, where he successfully retained the title by pinning Big Show after both Punk and Cena submitted Big Show at the same time and Raw general manager AJ Lee restarted the match. In the following weeks on Raw, Punk demanded respect from people like AJ Lee, Jerry Lawler and Bret Hart and eventually aligned with Paul Heyman in his feud with Cena. On September 16 at Night of Champions, Punk retained the WWE Championship after he fought Cena to a draw. Punk continued to feud with Cena despite the latter's arm injury, rejecting the requests of Mick Foley and Jim Ross to pick him as his Hell in a Cell opponent and leading to a brawl with WWE chairman Vince McMahon. Cena was eventually pulled from the title match and replaced by Ryback, whom Punk would defeat at Hell in a Cell on October 28 in a Hell in a Cell match with help from referee Brad Maddox to retain the title and also ending Ryback's thirty-eight match undefeated streak.

The next night on Raw, a furious Mick Foley confronted Punk for refusing to pick John Cena as his Hell in a Cell opponent, leading the two to agree to meet at Survivor Series in a Survivor Series match with Punk choosing Alberto Del Rio, Cody Rhodes, Damien Sandow and The Miz for his team. However, Punk was replaced as captain by Dolph Ziggler the following week on Raw and was instead booked in a triple threat WWE Championship match against John Cena and Ryback by Vince McMahon. At Survivor Series on November 18, Punk won the match by pinning Cena following interference from the debuting faction called The Shield (Dean Ambrose, Roman Reigns and Seth Rollins), allowing him to retain the WWE Championship and hold the championship for a full year. On December 4, Punk underwent surgery to repair a partially torn meniscus, removing him from his title match against Ryback on December 16 at TLC: Tables, Ladders & Chairs. Despite his injury, Punk became the longest-reigning WWE Champion in the past 25 years on December 5, when he hit 381 days, surpassing John Cena's 380-day reign. Punk returned to in-ring action on the January 7, 2013, episode of Raw, retaining the WWE Championship against Ryback in a TLC match following interference from The Shield.

On January 27 at the Royal Rumble, Punk defended the WWE Championship against The Rock in a match that stipulated that Punk would be stripped of the title if The Shield interfered. Punk originally pinned The Rock to retain after The Shield put Rock through a table while the arena lights were out, leading Vince McMahon to come out and announce that Punk would be stripped of the title, but he instead restarted the match at The Rock's request. Punk lost, ending his reign at 434 days. WWE recognized this reign as the longest world championship reign in WWE of the "modern era" (after 1988) until Universal Champion Brock Lesnar broke that record in June 2018. Punk received a title rematch with Rock on February 17 at Elimination Chamber, stipulated that The Rock would lose the title if he was disqualified or counted out, but Punk was pinned by Rock after miscommunication with Heyman. On the February 25 episode of Raw, Punk faced Royal Rumble winner John Cena for his number one contendership to the WWE Championship, but he lost.

Final storylines (2013–2014)
In March 2013, Punk set his sights on ending The Undertaker's undefeated WrestleMania streak in an effort to "take something away from the fans" as he believed they had taken the WWE Championship away from him. He defeated Big Show, Randy Orton and Sheamus in a fatal four-way match on the March 4 episode of Raw to officially earn the right to face The Undertaker. After the real-life death of Paul Bearer, Undertaker's former manager the next day, a storyline involving Punk regularly spiting The Undertaker through displays of flippancy and disrespect towards Bearer's death began, including Punk stealing Bearer's trademark urn. On April 7 at WrestleMania 29, Punk was defeated by The Undertaker, who took back the urn.

After defeating Chris Jericho at Payback, Punk started a storyline where he told Heyman to no longer accompany him to his matches and was later attacked by Heyman's other client Brock Lesnar, thus turning Punk face once again. Heyman also cost Punk a WWE Championship Money in the Bank ladder match at Money in the Bank when he attacked him. This led to a match between Punk and Lesnar at SummerSlam on August 18, when Punk lost to Lesnar in a No Disqualification match after Heyman interfered. His feud with Heyman continued during the following months, facing his other client, the Intercontinental Champion Curtis Axel. First, at Night of Champions, Punk faced Axel and Heyman in a no disqualification two-on-one handicap elimination match in which he made Axel submit, leaving only Heyman left, but Punk lost the match after Ryback interfered and put him through a table. Then, Punk defeated Ryback at Battleground and the feud ended at Hell in a Cell, where Punk faced Heyman and Ryback in a two-on-one handicap Hell in a Cell match, winning the match by pinning Heyman and after the match performing a "Go to Sleep" on him at the top of the cell.

Punk moved on to a feud with The Wyatt Family (Bray Wyatt, Erick Rowan and Luke Harper) and formed an alliance with Daniel Bryan, with the duo defeating Harper and Rowan in a tag team match on November 24 at Survivor Series. The next night on Raw, Punk was attacked by The Shield while attempting to save Bryan from being "taken hostage" by The Wyatt Family. Punk then insinuated that The Authority, a villainous group who controlled WWE led by Triple H and Stephanie McMahon, ordered the attack, which resulted in the Director of Operations Kane booking Punk in a three-on-one handicap match against The Shield at TLC: Tables, Ladders & Chairs. At TLC on December 15, Punk won the match after Reigns accidentally performed a spear on Ambrose. After further altercations between Punk and Kane, Kane made Punk the first entrant in the annual Royal Rumble match on January 26, 2014. At the Royal Rumble, near the end of the match, Kane, who was already eliminated earlier in the match by Punk, eliminated Punk from the outside and proceeded to perform a chokeslam on him through the announce table.

First retirement (2014)

Punk did not appear on the January 27 episode of Raw, nor did he appear at the SmackDown taping on Tuesday despite being advertised for the event. By Wednesday, WWE.com stopped advertising Punk for future events. The Wrestling Observer reported that on Monday and prior to Raw he had legitimately walked out after telling Vince McMahon and Triple H that he was "going home". On February 20 during a conference call to investors, McMahon said Punk was "taking a sabbatical". On the March 3 episode of Raw, WWE acknowledged Punk's absence on television when the show started with Punk's entrance music playing, only for former manager Paul Heyman to walk out. WWE proceeded to remove Punk from footage of their promotional videos. This lasted until the first half of July, where WWE used footage of Punk to promote the WWE Network. In an interview published in late May, Punk was asked how it felt "to be retired at 35" and replied that "it feels good". On July 15, WWE.com moved Punk from the active roster to the alumni page without releasing a statement. On the same day, Punk thanked his fans without mentioning WWE. In late July, Punk said that he was "never ever" going to return to wrestling.

On an episode of Colt Cabana's Art of Wrestling podcast released in November 2014, Punk broke his silence regarding his exit from WWE. In a detailed interview, Punk said that he was suspended for two months after walking out on the company in January and that after the suspension ended, nobody from WWE contacted him. Punk also said that when he reached out to them for unpaid royalties, he was given a run-around by company executives until he was handed his termination papers and was fired by WWE on his wedding day in June 2014. The manner of firing was the last straw for Punk, stating that he would never return to WWE and that following a legal settlement with WWE there would be no further working relationship between them. The settlement included Punk giving WWE permission to sell his remaining merchandise.

Punk cited his health as the main reason he left WWE, describing that in his final months in the company, he had been working through an untreated and potentially fatal MRSA infection (later Punk acknowledged on the witness stand that no physician ever diagnosed him with an MRSA staph infection), broken ribs, injured knees and multiple concussions, including one at the 2014 Royal Rumble, as well as having lost his appetite and ability to sleep well. Punk felt that WWE was pressuring and rushing him to wrestle before fully recovering. According to Punk, he found a lump on his back in November 2013, and it was diagnosed as a fatty deposit by Dr. Chris Amann, who refused to remove it despite Punk's requests. The week after Punk left WWE, his wife April Mendez convinced him to get the lump checked by her doctor. The doctor told Punk that he could have died due to ignoring it for such a long time. Punk had the doctor evacuate the infection, describing it as the worst pain in his life, but said that once it was treated and he was on stronger medication, he was able to sleep better than he had in months.

Other sources of unhappiness Punk had with WWE were his failure to main event a WrestleMania (deeming his entire career to be a failure as a result), being paid less than the other wrestlers in the three most significant matches of WrestleMania 29, doing favors for Vince McMahon and not being owed back, being "creatively stifled", feeling that there were no long-term plans for wrestlers other than John Cena, as well as receiving less pay and not getting answers as to how the advent of the WWE Network would affect wrestlers' salaries. Lastly, Punk described having left with "zero passion" for wrestling and described himself at the time of the interview to be the happiest in many years.

Less than one week later, while being interviewed on The Steve Austin Show on the WWE Network, Vince McMahon apologized to Punk for the manner of his termination, which he regarded as a coincidence due to a lack of communication within the organization. McMahon said that he was open to working with Punk again. In a second Art of Wrestling podcast, Punk rejected McMahon's apology as insincere and a "publicity stunt" as McMahon did not contact him directly to apologize and could have apologized earlier.

Post-retirement appearances (2015–2020)
His first known appearance during a wrestling match following his exit from WWE was at a Freelance Wrestling show on December 4, 2015, titled "Raw Power." He would manage Kikutaro in a match against Darin Corbin and Dick Justice. Punk was draped in a cloak and tossed around salt before the match. The commentators referred to him as Kikutaro's "nameless mentor," and Punk didn't get involved in the match.

On April 19, 2019, Punk appeared in a masked disguise at an event held by independent promotion MKE Wrestling, where he helped Ace Steel win a match by attacking his opponent with the GTS. While it was implied to be Punk by promotion owner Silas Young, nothing was confirmed by Punk.

On November 12, 2019, Punk made a surprise appearance on the Fox Sports 1 series WWE Backstage. He subsequently joined the program as a special contributor and analyst. Punk accepted the job because he would be under contract with Fox instead of WWE directly, and hoped it would help him find his way back into the wrestling business. Regarding an in-ring return, he was not interested but not opposed to the idea, noting it was "a bridge that is gonna have to be built." Production of WWE Backstage was halted due to the COVID-19 pandemic and subsequently suspended by Fox in June 2020.

All Elite Wrestling (2021–present)
On August 20, 2021, Punk made his debut for All Elite Wrestling (AEW) at The First Dance event on Rampage, challenging Darby Allin to a match at the All Out pay-per-view event. This marked Punk's return to professional wrestling after a seven-year retirement. He won the match against Allin at All Out on September 5. Following a brief feud with Eddie Kingston, whom Punk defeated at Full Gear, Punk experienced his first defeat in AEW in February 2022, losing to MJF in a singles match on Dynamite after months of feuding between the two. Punk avenged his loss to MJF at Revolution in a Dog Collar match.

At Double or Nothing on May 29, Punk defeated "Hangman" Adam Page to win the AEW World Championship, his first world title victory since the 2011 Survivor Series. Five days after winning the AEW World Championship, Punk announced on the June 3 episode of Rampage that he would be out of in-ring action to recover from an injury, however he would remain champion. Jon Moxley was crowned as interim champion in Punk's place at AEW x NJPW: Forbidden Door on June 26, and a title unification bout would be held upon Punk's return from injury.

At the Quake by the Lake special episode of Dynamite on August 10, Punk made his return and confronted Moxley, entering into a title dispute. A match to determine the undisputed AEW World Champion was then scheduled at All Out. However, due to heated confrontations between the two, it was announced that the match would instead take place on the August 24 episode of Dynamite, where Punk was quickly defeated by Moxley, ending Punk's reign at 86 days. The following week on Dynamite, Moxley laid out an open challenge for anyone to face him at All Out, which was accepted by Punk. At All Out on September 4, Punk defeated Moxley to win his record-tying second AEW World Championship.

At the post-All Out media scrum, Punk took issue with certain members of the media as he addressed the real-life rumor that he had attempted to get his former friend Colt Cabana fired from AEW, which he adamantly denied. His denial of the rumor was backed up by AEW president Tony Khan, who had previously denied the rumor following ROH's 2022 Death Before Dishonor event. Punk cited "irresponsible people who call themselves EVPs" (AEW's EVPs are Kenny Omega and the Young Bucks, who wrestle as  The Elite) and "Hangman" Adam Page as the reason why the rumor was leaked in the weeks leading up to All Out. He also addressed an incident where Page went off-script in a face-to-face promo leading up to their match at Double or Nothing in May, with Punk saying, "What did I ever do in this world to deserve an empty-headed fucking dumb fuck like 'Hangman' Adam Page to go out on national television and fucking go into business for himself? For what? What did I do?" Multiple publications reported that Punk's comments subsequently caused a legitimate fight between Punk, his friend Ace Steel, Omega, and the Young Bucks backstage. 

The following episode of Dynamite on September 7, Khan announced that the AEW World Championship had been vacated, leading to a tournament that ended with Moxley reclaiming the championship. The AEW World Trios Championship, won by The Elite at All Out, was simultaneously announced as being vacated. As of the same show, images of Punk, Omega and The Young Bucks no longer appeared in the opening video of AEW programming. The four would not appear on any AEW shows, until The Elite's return at  Full Gear on November 19, more than two months later. On September 8, Dave Meltzer reported that Punk tore a muscle in his arm during his match at All Out and would require major surgery; it is expected the injury will keep him out of the ring for up to 8 months, though his future with AEW regardless of the injury was unclear.

Professional wrestling persona

Punk adopted his real-life following of the straight edge movement as a major attribute of his professional wrestling character. The character utilizes different elements of Punk's personality and beliefs of the straight edge movement dependent on his alignment. While portraying a crowd favorite, Punk's character tends to be that of Punk's normal personality, largely indifferent to others who drink alcohol, smoke tobacco, partake in recreational drug use or have promiscuous sexual behavior, but emphasizing the social discipline involved with personally abstaining from these behaviors. Conversely, his villainous personality tends to be that of one who is hardline or militant straight edge, exemplifying the elitist attitudes and superiority complexes – defined by Punk's common mantra during villainous-themed promos that because he is straight edge, he is "better than you." Punk performs the straight edge symbol of crossing his arms in an X formation while having the letter X written on the back of his hands, usually drawn on his wrist tape. During his WWE career, Punk also incorporated a belligerently anti-establishment and anti-corporate attitude into his persona.

Originally, the initials CM in his ring name represented the phrase "Chick Magnet", the name of the tag team he was in as a backyard wrestler. However, Punk later changed CM into a pseudo-acronym, declaring that it has no meaning, though when asked since he has taken to making up meanings that fit the initials, going so far as to make up long stories to explain the origins that do not match the actual origin story at all. Since beginning this practice, Punk has stated CM stands among others for "Cookie Monster", "Crooked Moonsault", "Chuck Mosley", "Charles Montgomery", "Charles Manson", "Charlie Murphy", and "Chicago Made".

During his entrance, Punk yells "It's clobberin' time!", a reference to New York City hardcore punk band Sick of It All who wrote a song with the same name and Marvel's fictional character The Thing. As his entrance theme, Punk uses the song "Cult of Personality" by Living Colour, with which he is often associated.

An integral part of Punk is the numerous tattoos that adorn his body, some of which have become symbols associated with Punk and mantras and declarations that have been integrated into his gimmick. The tattoos as a whole, due to their large quantity and variety, have also become an attribute identifiable to Punk. The most important of the individual tattoos in Punk's character – whether through association, symbol, or mantra – are the following:
A Pepsi Globe logo on his left shoulder that inspired the names of two of his signature moves. It also became a symbol of Punk himself, who wore the logo on his ring gear in the independent circuit as well as a slightly modified Pepsi logo being used as part of his TitanTron entrance video. Punk, a keen Pepsi drinker, chose to receive a Pepsi tattoo to emphasize his straight edge beliefs. The tattoo is also a reference to former Minor Threat guitarist Brian Baker, who had a Coca-Cola tattoo and explained this by saying "I like Coca-Cola". When people inquire about Punk's Pepsi tattoo, he often replies "I like Pepsi" in a similar fashion.
The words "Straight Edge" are spelled out on Punk's stomach. This is one of his oldest tattoos and he has referred to it as his identity.
A sleeve tattoo on his left arm that reads "luck is for losers" and features numerous good luck symbols, including a rabbit's foot, four-leaf clover and a horseshoe. The tattoo also features four ace playing cards as a tribute to trainer Ace Steel.
The phrase "No gimmicks needed" on the back of his left hand, a tribute to deceased wrestler Chris Candido.
The words "Drug Free" across his knuckles ("Drug" on his right knuckles and "Free" on his left).
 His younger sister's jersey number (31) behind his left ear, surrounded by stars, each of which represent his siblings as a way to bond away from home.
 The Cobra Command logo (G.I. Joe's enemy) on his right shoulder. Punk is known for his love of comic books, considering them along with jazz and professional wrestling as three of the original arts that America has given to the world.

Legacy
Several wrestlers have publicly cited Punk as an inspiration or influence on their careers. Seth Rollins said in December 2018 that Punk's influence on the Chicago wrestling scene was responsible for him becoming a wrestler in the first place, while Rhea Ripley said in September 2019 that Punk's verbal skills were something she aspired to because "when he spoke, everyone listened", and Adam Cole told Sports Illustrated in November 2019 that Punk's work on the independent circuit was a "huge influence" on him.

Reporters, wrestlers, and fans alike have praised Punk's speaking skills, especially his in-ring promos. His June 2011 "Pipebomb" promo has been called "historic" and is regarded as one of the most important promos in professional wrestling history. Punk is credited with being one of the first independent wrestlers to have success in WWE, which in turn opened the door for other independent wrestlers to both join and succeed in WWE. Although much of his time as a top star in WWE was during its heavily watered-down PG Era, Erik Beaston of Bleacher Report wrote that "Punk turned the company on its head for a few short years and gave fans a taste of what an alternative to the advertiser-obsessed promotion could look like".

Mixed martial arts career

Ultimate Fighting Championship (2014–2018)
At UFC 181, on December 6, 2014, Punk announced that he had signed a multi-fight contract with Ultimate Fighting Championship (UFC). When asked if he would compete under his ring name or birth name, he told the Las Vegas Sun: "I've come this far with CM Punk. That's what people know. I'm trying to stick with that. I'm not shying away from it. I'm not ashamed of it." His UFC profile lists him as CM Punk.

In January 2015, Punk began training under Duke Roufus at Roufusport MMA Academy. In June 2015, Punk moved to Milwaukee to be closer to the Roufusport gym while still retaining his home in Chicago. Later, it was announced that Punk would compete in the welterweight division. In October 2015, Roufus announced that Punk had suffered a shoulder injury, delaying his UFC debut until the next calendar year. On February 6, 2016, it was announced that Punk would face Mickey Gall in his first professional mixed martial arts (MMA) contest, but he was diagnosed with a herniated disc and underwent surgery days later.

Punk's UFC and MMA debut against Mickey Gall took place on September 10 at UFC 203. The event was held at the Quicken Loans Arena, the same venue where Punk left WWE and retired from professional wrestling. Punk was taken down immediately and lost via rear naked choke submission early in the first round. He was paid a disclosed $500,000.

Punk's second professional bout took place at UFC 225 on June 9, 2018, against Mike Jackson, in his hometown of Chicago. Punk lost the one-sided fight via unanimous decision. After the bout, UFC president Dana White said that both Punk and Jackson would probably not fight for the UFC again, and urged Punk to "call it a wrap". Three years after the bout, it was made public that the result was overturned to a no contest after Jackson tested positive for marijuana. In August 2021, Punk notified the UFC he would be retiring from MMA after he returned to professional wrestling earlier that month.

Cage Fury Fighting Championships (2018–present)
On November 8, 2018, Punk signed with the Cage Fury Fighting Championships (CFFC) promotion (a UFC affiliate) as a commentator. His first event was CFFC 71 on December 14 and it was streamed live on UFC Fight Pass.

Personal life
Brooks married fellow wrestler April Mendez, also known as AJ Lee, on June 13, 2014. He is an atheist, and has been outspoken in his support for LGBT rights and same-sex marriage. Like his wrestling persona, he follows a straight edge lifestyle. Brooks once worked for a shop named All American Comics.

In February 2015, WWE doctor Christopher Amann filed a defamation lawsuit against Brooks and Scott Colton over Brooks's allegations of medical malpractice on an episode of Colton's podcast (see above). Amann was seeking roughly $4 million in compensation and an undisclosed amount in punitive damages. WWE issued a statement and video in support of Amann. The case went to trial in 2018, where a jury ruled in favor of Brooks and Colton. In August 2018, Colton filed a lawsuit against Brooks, alleging breach of contract and fraud due to Brooks's alleged agreement and later refusal to pay Colton's legal fees for the Amann suit. Colton sought $200,000 in damages and an additional $1 million in punitive damages. Brooks filed a counterclaim against Colton in June 2019, for $600,000 and additional fees. Both lawsuits were settled and dismissed in September 2019. According to PWInsider, the settlement involved no financial compensation.

Other media

Acting and appearances

In 2008, Brooks appeared as the Sports Grand Marshal of the nationally televised McDonald's Thanksgiving Parade in downtown Chicago. He reprised this role in 2012.

Brooks has appeared alongside his friend and Brazilian Jiu-Jitsu coach Rener Gracie in several episodes of the YouTube series Gracie Breakdown. He has also worked with Nerdist Industries, including hosting an ongoing series titled Grammar Slam, explaining grammatical mistakes in messages from professional wrestling fans and berating them.

Brooks was the cover athlete for the video game WWE '13. In 2015, he was featured in Frank Turner's "The Next Storm" music video.

Brooks made his acting debut in the 2019 horror film Girl on the Third Floor. His performance was praised as "compelling", "down-to-earth", and "energetic and charismatic", with one review stating that he "nails it".

Brooks currently stars in the wrestling drama series Heels (2021–present).

Writing
Brooks wrote the introduction for the hardcover edition of Marvel Comics' 2012 crossover event Avengers vs. X-Men and described the opportunity as a "geek dream come true".

In 2013, Brooks wrote a foreword for his friend and ex-girlfriend Natalie Slater's cookbook Bake and Destroy: Good Food for Bad Vegans.

In February 2015, Marvel Comics' Thor Annual No. 1, partly written by Brooks, was released. He cowrote "The Most Cursed", which appeared in Vertigo Comics' Strange Sports Stories No. 3 in May 2015. Brooks also cowrote Marvel Comics' Drax ongoing series. Brooks wrote a one-shot of Marvel's Master of Kung Fu, which was published in November 2017.

Filmography

Mixed martial arts record

|-
|NC
|align=center|0–1 (1)
|Mike Jackson
|NC (overturned)
|UFC 225
|
|align=center|3
|align=center|5:00
|Chicago, Illinois, United States
|Originally a unanimous decision win for Jackson; overturned after he tested positive for marijuana.
|-
|Loss
|align=center|0–1
|Mickey Gall
|Submission (rear-naked choke)
|UFC 203
|
|align=center|1
|align=center|2:14
|Cleveland, Ohio, United States
|
|-

Championships and accomplishments

 All Elite Wrestling
AEW World Championship (2 times)
AEW Dynamite Awards (2 times) 
Best Moment on the Mic (2022) - 
Best Mic Duel (2022) - 
The Baltimore Sun
Feud of the Year (2009) 
Independent Wrestling Association Mid-South
IWA Mid-South Heavyweight Championship (5 times)
IWA Mid-South Light Heavyweight Championship (2 times)
International Wrestling Cartel
IWC World Heavyweight Championship (1 time)
Mid-American Wrestling
Mid-American Wrestling Heavyweight Championship (1 time)
Mid-American Heavyweight Championship Tournament (2001)
NWA Cyberspace
NWA Cyberspace Tag Team Championship (1 time) – with Julio Dinero
Ohio Valley Wrestling
OVW Heavyweight Championship (1 time)
OVW Southern Tag Team Championship (1 time) – with Seth Skyfire
OVW Television Championship (1 time)
Pro Wrestling Illustrated
Comeback of the Year (2021)
Feud of the Year (2011) 
 Feud of the Year (2022) 
 Match of the Year (2011) 
Most Popular Wrestler of the Year (2011, 2021)
Most Hated Wrestler of the Year (2012)
Wrestler of the Year (2011, 2012)
Ranked No. 1 of the top 500 singles wrestlers in the PWI 500 in 2012
Revolution Championship Wrestling
RCW Championship (1 time)
Revolver
Golden Gods Award for Most Metal Athlete (2012)
Ring of Honor
ROH World Championship (1 time)
ROH Tag Team Championship (2 times) – with Colt Cabana
ROH Hall of Fame (class of 2022)
St. Paul Championship Wrestling/Steel Domain Wrestling
SPCW Northern States Light Heavyweight Championship (2 times)
 SPCE Northern States Light Heavyweight Championship Tournament (2000)
World Wrestling Entertainment / WWE
ECW Championship (1 time)
World Heavyweight Championship (3 times)
World Tag Team Championship (1 time) – with Kofi Kingston
WWE Championship (2 times)
WWE Intercontinental Championship (1 time)
Money in the Bank (2008, 2009)
WWE Intercontinental Championship #1 Contender's Tournament (2008)
Nineteenth Triple Crown Champion
Slammy Award (7 times)
"OMG" Moment of the Year (2008) – 
Shocker of the Year (2009) – 
Despicable Me (2010) – 
Superstar of the Year (2011)
"Pipe Bomb" of the Year (2011)
T-shirt of the Year (2011) – 
Extreme Moment of the Year (2013) – 
Wrestling Observer Newsletter
Best Box Office Draw (2021)
Most Charismatic (2021) 
Best Gimmick (2009, 2011)
Best on Interviews (2011, 2012)
Feud of the Year (2009) 
Feud of the Year (2011) 
Pro Wrestling Match of the Year (2011) 
Most Disgusting Promotional Tactic (2012) 
Most Disgusting Promotional Tactic (2013)

Notes

References

External links

1978 births
20th-century professional wrestlers
21st-century professional wrestlers
21st-century American male actors
All Elite Wrestling personnel
American atheists
American color commentators
American comics writers
American male film actors
American male mixed martial artists
American male professional wrestlers
American practitioners of Brazilian jiu-jitsu
AEW World Champions
ROH World Champions
ECW Heavyweight Champions/ECW World Heavyweight Champions
Expatriate professional wrestlers in Japan
Living people
Male actors from Chicago
Marvel Comics writers
Masked wrestlers
Mixed martial artists from Illinois
Mixed martial artists utilizing wrestling
Mixed martial artists utilizing Muay Thai
Mixed martial artists utilizing Brazilian jiu-jitsu
Professional wrestling announcers
Professional wrestlers from Illinois
Sportspeople from Chicago
The Challenge (TV series) contestants
Ultimate Fighting Championship male fighters
Writers from Chicago
World Heavyweight Champions (WWE)
WWF/WWE Intercontinental Champions
WWE Champions
American Muay Thai practitioners
ROH World Tag Team Champions
OVW Heavyweight Champions